East Norwich is a hamlet and census-designated place (CDP) located within the Town of Oyster Bay in Nassau County, on the North Shore of Long Island, in New York, United States. The population was 2,709 at the 2010 census.

History 
East Norwich was originally named Norwich, until the postal service requested the name change to eliminate confusion from the other Norwich, in Chenango County.

Geography

Demographics

As of the census of 2010, there were 2,709 people, 966 households, and 772 families residing in the CDP. The population density was 2,554.5 per square mile (983.6/km2). There were 950 housing units at an average density of 907.2/sq mi (349.3/km2). The racial makeup of the CDP was 93.50% White, 0.80% African American, 3.50% Asian, 1.10% from other races, and 1.10% from two or more races. Hispanic or Latino of any race were 4.40% of the population.

There were 943 households, out of which 35.5% had children under the age of 18 living with them, 69.4% were married couples living together, 9.8% had a female householder with no husband present, and 18.1% were non-families. 15.1% of all households were made up of individuals, and 7.8% had someone living alone who was 65 years of age or older. The average household size was 2.85 and the average family size was 3.19.

In the CDP, the population was spread out, with 26.6% under the age of 19, 4.1% from 20 to 24, 21.3% from 25 to 44, 31.9% from 45 to 64, and 16.0% who were 65 years of age or older. The median age was 43.5 years. For every 100 females, there were 91.57 males. For every 100 females age 18 and over, there were 88.0 males.

The median income for a household in the CDP was $134,309, and the median income for a family was $159,890. Males had a median income of $114,934 versus $86,250 for females. The per capita income for the CDP was $62,052. About 4.0% of families and 4.0% of the population were below the poverty line, including 5.8% of those under age 18 and 1.1% of those age 65 or over.

Notable people
Thomas Pynchon – Author.

References

Oyster Bay (town), New York
Census-designated places in New York (state)
Hamlets in New York (state)
Census-designated places in Nassau County, New York
Hamlets in Nassau County, New York